Tantillita is a genus of snakes in the family Colubridae. The genus is endemic to Central America.

Species and subspecies
Three species are recognized as being valid. One species has two subspecies, including the nominotypical subspecies.
Tantillita brevissima 
Tantillita canula 
Tantillita lintoni 
Tantillita lintoni lintoni 
Tantillita lintoni rozellae 

Nota bene: A binomial authority or a trinomial authority in parentheses indicates that the species or the subspecies, respectively, was originally described in a genus other than Tantillita.

Etymology
The specific name, lintoni, is in honor of American archeologist Linton Satterthwaite.

The subspecific name, rozellae, is in honor of American herpetologist Rozella Blood Smith, wife of American herpetologist Hobart Muir Smith.

Reproduction
All species in the genus Tantillita are oviparous.

References

Further reading
Heimes, Peter (2016). Snakes of Mexico: Herpetofauna Mexicana Vol. I. Frankfurt, Germany: Chimaira. 572 pp. .
Smith HM (1941). "A new genus of Central American snakes related to Tantilla ". Journal of the Washington Academy of Sciences 31 (3): 115-117. (Tantillita, new genus, p. 117).

Colubrids
Snake genera